Fai Chai station, is an elevated railway station on MRT Blue Line. The station opened on 23 December 2019. The station is one of the nine stations of phase 3 of MRT Blue Line. The railway line runs on a bowstring bridge above Fai Chai intersection, of which the station is named after.

References 

MRT (Bangkok) stations